There are over 20,000 Grade II* listed buildings in England. As the county of Cornwall contains 586 of these sites they have been split into alphabetical order.

Grade II* listed buildings in Cornwall (A–G)
Grade II* listed buildings in Cornwall (H–P)
Grade II* listed buildings in Cornwall (Q–Z)

See also

 Grade I listed buildings in Cornwall

 
Lists of Grade II* listed buildings in Cornwall